Aveyron is a department in the region of Occitania, Southern France. It was named after the river Aveyron. Its inhabitants are known as Aveyronnais (masculine) or Aveyronnaises (feminine) in French. The inhabitants of Aveyron's prefecture, Rodez, are called Ruthénois, based upon the first Celtic settlers in the area, the Ruteni.

History

Aveyron is one of the original 83 departments created during the French Revolution on 4 March 1790. The first known historical inhabitants of the region were the Rutenii tribe, but the area was inhabited previously to this, boasting many prehistoric ruins including over 1,000 dolmens, more than any other department in France.

During the medieval and early modern periods, and until the 1790s, the territory covered by Aveyron was a province known as Rouergue. In 1797, Victor of Aveyron (a feral child) was found wandering the woods in the area. The story of Victor is told in the film The Wild Child.

Heraldry

Geography 
Aveyron is the centre of a triangle formed by the cities of Toulouse, Clermont-Ferrand, and Montpellier. The department approximately follows the outline of the former province of Rouergue. It is the 5th largest department in metropolitan France in terms of area. Its prefecture is Rodez. 

The department comes under the jurisdiction of the Academy of Toulouse and the Montpellier Court of Appeal. The INSEE and Post Code is 12. Aveyron is located in the south of the Massif Central. The highest point in the department is the summit of Le Signal de Mailhebiau at 1469m on the Plateau of Aubrac. The Aveyron department is divided into several natural regions such as the Grand Causses and Rougiers.

Aveyron department consists of an ancient high rocky plateau of great geological diversity. The Truyère, Lot, Aveyron, and Tarn rivers have carved a number of deep gorges. The department is surrounded by those of Tarn, Tarn-et-Garonne, Lot, Hérault, Gard, Lozère and Cantal. The Lac de Villefranche-de-Panat is used as a reservoir to provide drinking water supplies for the region.

Climate

Demography
In 2017, the department had 279,206 inhabitants. The evolution of the number of inhabitants is known through the population censuses conducted in the department since 1793.

Principal towns

The most populous commune is Rodez, the prefecture. Of the department's population, 25% live in the four largest communes: Rodez, Millau, Onet-le-Château, and Villefranche-de-Rouergue. As of 2019, there are 7 communes with more than 5,000 inhabitants:

Second homes
As of 2019, 17.4% of available housing in the department were second homes.

Politics

Departmental Council

The Department Council of Aveyron has 46 seats. The President of the Departmental Council has been Jean-François Galliard of the Union of Democrats and Independents (UDI) from 2017 to 2021. The President has been Arnaud Viala since 2021.

Members of the National Assembly
Following the 2017 legislative election, Aveyron elected the following representatives to the National Assembly:

Culture

Regional sub-dialect
The regional sub-dialect spoken in Aveyron is a form of Languedoc Occitan called Rouergat. Faced with the risk of disappearance of the language several associations asked the State and political communities for an ambitious language policy. 
In Rouergat, Aveyron is written:
Avairon (traditional Occitan spelling) – e.g. "Roergue forma lo despartament de l'Avairon"
Oboyróu (spelling of Father Vayssier) – e.g. "Rouergue fouórmo lou desportomén de l'Oboyróu"

Tourism 
Aveyron contains a part of the Cévennes National Park. Tourist attractions include the castle of Najac, a medieval ruin perched high on a hill, and other castles and monasteries such as Conques Abbey, Sylvanès Abbey, Bonneval Abbey and Loc-Dieu Abbey, located near Martiel in a region with many dolmens. The small city of Millau is the site of the world's tallest bridge, the Millau viaduct, opened by President Chirac in December 2004.

Activities include horseriding, fishing, swimming in the Lacs du Lévézou and hiking/camping. The inhabitants are also very good craftsmen, and Aveyron is full of various craft objects, handmade, that can be found locally. Examples include the couteau de Laguiole, the world famous Roquefort cheese, from the village of the same name and other local produce. Markets take place every Saturday on market places around the region.

Saint-Sernin-sur-Rance is the commune where the feral child Victor of Aveyron was found in the late 18th century.

Les Plus Beaux Villages de France
Ten towns in Aveyron fall within the classification of a 1901 association Les Plus Beaux Villages de France:
Belcastel
Brousse-le-Château
La Couvertoirade
Conques 
Estaing 
Najac
Peyre
Saint-Côme-d'Olt
Sainte-Eulalie-d'Olt
Sauveterre-de-Rouergue.

Other tourist spots
Roquecézière
Saint-Geniez-d'Olt
Loc-Dieu Abbey
Bonneval Abbey
Coupiac
Aubrac Mountains
Causse du Larzac
Château de Sévérac
Bournazel
Baraqueville
Château de Calmont d'Olt
Rodez
Millau
Pons
Medieval villages in the Muse Valley:
Castelnau-Pégayrols
Saint-Beauzély
Montjaux
Villefranche-de-Rouergue
Villeneuve
The Trou de Bozouls
The Tindoul de la Vayssière
Vale of Marcillac, Vineyards and towns:
Marcillac-Vallon
Salles-la-Source
Clairvaux-d'Aveyron
Muret-le-Château
The Lakes of Lévézou
Laguiole
The Gorges du Tarn
Sainte-Eulalie-de-Cernon
Salles-Curan and the Lac de Pareloup
Salvagnac-Cajarc
Roquefort-sur-Soulzon
Saint-Sernin-sur-Rance, classed as a historic area with the "Feral child": Victor of Aveyron
Peyrusse-le-Roc
Grotto of Foissac
The Basin of Decazeville (Decazeville, Aubin, Cransac, Firmi and Viviez) with old coal mines.

Societies
Central Agricultural Society of Aveyron, founded in 1798
Society of letters, sciences and arts of Aveyron, founded in 1836

Notable people linked to the department
Déodat Alaus, master mason of the 15th century, builder of the city ramparts of the Templars and Hospitallers city of Larzac
Ambrose Crozot, painter, born in Rodez at the end of the 17th century
Denis Auguste Affre, Archbishop of Paris (1793–1848)
Georges d'Armagnac, Bishop of Avignon, cardinal and Bishop of Rodez (died in 1585)
Marie–Auguste de Balsac, high functionary
Louis Balsan, archaeologist, caver, one of the last great disciples of Martel (1903–1988)
Adolphe de Barrau, naturalist (1803–1884)
Hippolyte de Barrau, founder of the Society of Letters, scholar (1794–1863)
Justin Bessou, Occitan poet (1845–1918)
Adolphe Boisse, engineer and politician (1810–1896)
Louis Gabriel Ambroise de Bonald, philosopher (1754–1840)
Louis-Jacques Maurice de Bonald, bishop (1787–1870)
Émile Borel, mathematician (1871–1956)
José Bové, anti-globalizationist, MEP since 2009, farmer, activist and former spokesman of French farmers union Confédération paysanne, peasant in the cause of Larzac (1953 -)
Michel Bras (1946 -), chef.
Jean Carrier, clergyman of the 15th century, the last supporter and successor of the Antipope Benedict XIII under the name of Benedict XIV
Edouard de Castelnau, General (1851–1944)
Marc Cenci, former president of the Regional Council of Midi-Pyrénées, former mayor of Rodez (1936 -)
Hippolyte Coste, botanist (1858–1924)
Jean-Louis Cromières, artisan farmer who "revived" the Laguiole knife
François d'Estaing, Bishop of Rodez (1501–1529)
François Fabié, poet (1846–1926)
Jean-Henri Fabre, French entomologist and writer (1823–1915)
Robert Fabre, founder of the Movement of Radicals of the left, Ombudsman (1915–2006)
Maurice Fenaille, patron (1855–1937)
Denis-Luc Frayssinous, bishop and tutor of the Dauphin
Antoine Bernardin Fualdes, prosecutor, assassinated (1761–1817)
Gustave Garrigou, winner of the Tour de France in 1911, born in Vabre-Tizac
Alexandre Geniez, racing cyclist
Charles Girou de Buzareingues, agronomist and philosopher
Jacques d'Izarn Valady, officer, deputy, shot (1766–1793)
Guy Lacombe, football coach (1955–)
Amédée-Jean-Baptiste Latieule, Bishop of Vannes (1838–1903)
Jean-Claude Luche, Chairman of the General Council of Aveyron
Cardinal Marty, Archbishop of Paris (1904–1994)
Amans-Alexis Monteil, historian (1769–1850)
Antoine de Morlhon, bishop (1753–1828)
Auguste de Morlhon, bishop (1799–1862)
Alain Peyrefitte, writer, minister, member of the Académie française (1925–1999)
Pierre Poujade, politician, was born and lived in Labastide l'Evêque
Denys Puech, sculptor, director of the Villa Medicis (1854–1942)
Jean Puech, former President of the General Council of Aveyron, Senator, and former minister (1942 -)
Jacques Puel, Ruthénois physician specializing in cardiothoracic surgery (1949–2008)
Guillaume-Thomas Raynal, historian, philosopher (1713–1796)
Emilie de Rodat, founder of the congregation of the Sisters of the Holy Family of Villefranche (1787–1852)
Richard Sainct, motorcycle rider (1970–2004)
Pierre Frédéric Sarrus, mathematician (1798–1861)
Pierre Soulages, painter (1919–2022)
Jean Verdier, Cardinal Archbishop of Paris (1864–1940)
Eugène Viala, painter, poet (1859–1913)
Auguste Denayrouze, Scientist, Inventor, writer (1837–1883)
Gaëtan Roussel, songwriter (1972–)
Father Aimé Vayssier, ecclesiastical bachelor of letters, author of the French patois dictionary of the department of Aveyron (1821–1875)
Dom Pierre Guérin, ecclesiastic from Nantes, Rouergat poet (1608–1698)
Jules Merviel, cyclist active in the 1930s, born in Saint-Beauzély (1906–1976)
Bertrand Delanoe, French politician and Mayor of Paris (1950–)
Cyril Lignac, French chef and TV host
Jean Boudou, Occitan writer born in Crespin (home of Joan Bodon)
Bernard Laporte, rugby coach (1964–)
Francis Poulenc, Composer (1899–1963)

Bibliography
Encyclopedia Bonneton, Aveyron, Christine Bonneton, 2005 
Jean-Michel Cosson, Dictionary of Aveyron, Loubatières,  
Daniel Crozes, The Guide to Aveyron, Éditions du Rouergue,  
Aue/Miche, Aveyron (Discovered), MSM,  
Dominique Auzias, Jean-Paul Labourdette, The small clever Aveyron, Collectif, Nouvelles Éditions Université,  
Paul Astruc, Major Criminal cases of Aveyron, Éditions De Borée,  
Christian Bernard, Aveyron in flowers: Illustrated inventory of vascular plants of Aveyron department, Éditions du Rouergue,  
Francine Claustres, Aveyron Cuisine, Sud Ouest,  
Aveyron: Farming Yields, Du Curieux,  
French Hiking Federation, Aveyron on foot, Guide FFRP,  
French Hiking Federation, The most beautiful villages in Aveyron… on foot: 20 walks and hikes, FFRP,  
Hubert Calmette, The paths of Émilie in Aveyron, French Hiking Federation,  
Richard André, Romain Pages Éditions, Le Parc naturel régional des Grands Causses,  
Rémi Soulié, The old Rouergue: Land of Aveyron, Paris,  
Alain Marc, Aveyron, Logbooks, Éditions du Rouergue,  
Laurent Millet, Family names of Aveyron, Archives Cult,  
Laurent Barthe, Of Rouergue in Aveyron, Empreinte,  
Aveyron 1900–1920 Édition De Boree,  
Jean-Michel Cosson, Stéphane Monnet, Aveyron in the 1939–1945 war, Éditions De Boré,  
Jill Dawson, Béatrice Dunner, The wild child of Aveyron, Du Rocher,  
Jean Itard, Victor de l'Aveyron, Allia,  
Dagonet/Christian, Regards to Aveyron, De Borée,  
Nicole de Bertier, Meeting in Aveyron, '' Equinoxe,

See also
Arrondissements of the Aveyron department
County of Rodez 
Cantons of the Aveyron department
Communes of the Aveyron department
Maison de Jeanne

References

External links
 Prefecture website
 Departmental council of Aveyron's website
 Aveyron's bulletin board

 
Massif Central
1790 establishments in France
Departments of Occitania (administrative region)
States and territories established in 1790